Richard Burke "Dick" Deaver (born February 7, 1931) is an American competitive sailor and Olympic medalist. He was born in Huntington Park, California. He won a bronze medal in the Dragon class at the 1964 Summer Olympics in Tokyo, together with Lowell North and Charles Rogers.

References

External links

1931 births
Living people
Sportspeople from Los Angeles County, California
American male sailors (sport)
Sailors at the 1964 Summer Olympics – Dragon
Olympic bronze medalists for the United States in sailing
Medalists at the 1964 Summer Olympics
20th-century American people
21st-century American people